The Woodstock District Community Complex (now known as the Reeves Community Complex) is considered to be the social epicentre of the Canadian community of Woodstock, Ontario.

Summary

This facility is the host of Woodstock Navy-Vets hockey games from November to April and community events year-round for the general public as well as private organizations. Besides two ice rinks, the complex also hosts the Woodstock Gymnastics Club, a banquet hall, and an extension site for Fanshawe College. A Woodstock Sports Wall of Fame is also prominently displayed in the building's main foyer; displaying the local elite of the sporting world. The facility is run by the City of Woodstock.

One of the most recent major events using this community centre was the provincial qualifying rounds for the 2009 Tim Hortons Brier (also known as the 2009 TSC Stores Tankard). The competition took place from February 2 to February 8. The tournament attracted the best men's curling players from all over Ontario Glenn Howard was given the honour of representing the Ontario provincial curling team in the national tournament in Calgary at the Pengrowth Saddledome (now known as Scotiabank Saddledome).

The Complex also hosted the Ontario Tankard in 2001. It was also the venue for wrestling at the 2001 Canada Games.

References

External links
 Ball Con
 City of Woodstock

1996 establishments in Ontario
Indoor arenas in Ontario
Indoor ice hockey venues in Canada
Sports venues in Ontario
Sport in Woodstock, Ontario
Buildings and structures in Oxford County, Ontario